Micractis is the scientific name for a genus of plants and a genus of animals:

Micractis (moth), a genus of moths, now synonymized with the genus Ostrinia
Micractis (plant), a genus of plants in the daisy family